David du Plessis (12 June 1926 – 26 March 1996) was a South African sports shooter. He competed in the 50 metre rifle, prone event at the 1960 Summer Olympics.

References

1926 births
1996 deaths
South African male sport shooters
Olympic shooters of South Africa
Shooters at the 1960 Summer Olympics
People from Rustenburg
20th-century South African people